Gram Panchayat is a basic village-governing institute in Indian villages. It is a democratic structure at the grass-roots level in India. It is a political institute, acting as cabinet of the village. The Gram Sabha work as the general body of the Gram Panchayat. The members of the Gram Panchayat are elected directly by the people.

There are about 250,000+ Gram Panchayats in India.

History 
Established in various states of India, the Panchayat Raj system has three tiers: Zila Parishad, at the district level; Panchayat Samiti, at the block level; and Gram Panchayat, at the village level. Rajasthan was the first state to establish Gram Panchayat, Bagdari Village (Nagaur District) being the first village where Gram Panchayat was established, on 2 October 1959.

The failed attempts to deal with local matters at the national level caused, in 1992, the reintroduction of Panchayats for their previously used purpose as an organisation for local self-governance.

Structure
Gram Panchayats are at the lowest level of Panchayat Raj institutions (PRIs), whose legal authority is the 73rd Constitutional Amendment of 1992, which is concerned with rural local governments.
 Panchayat at District (or apex) Level
 Panchayat at Intermediate Level
 Panchayat at Base Level

The Gram Panchayat is divided into wards and each ward is represented by a Ward Member or Commissioner, also referred to as a Panch or Panchayat Member, who is directly elected by the villagers. The Panchayat is chaired by the president of the village, known as a Sarpanch. The term of the elected representatives is five years. The Secretary of the Panchayat is a non-elected representative, appointed by the state government, to oversee Panchayat activities.

Meetings
According to Section. 6 (3) of the Andhra Pradesh Panchayat Raj Act of 1994, that state's gram sabha has to conduct a meeting at least twice a year.

Election 
A Sarpanch's term of office is five years. Every five years elections take place in the village. All people over the age of 18 who are residents of the territory of that village's Gram panchayat can vote.

For women's empowerment and to encourage participation of women in the democratic process, the government of India has set some restrictions on Gram panchayat elections, reserving one-third of the seats for women, as well as reserving seats for scheduled castes and tribes.

Functions 

 Administrative functions
 Public work and welfare functions, such as maintenance, repair and construction of roads, drains, bridges, and wells.
 Install and maintain street lamps.
 Provide primary education.
 Social and Economic functions (not obligatory)
 Construct libraries, marriage halls, etc.
 Establish and run fair-price shops and cooperative credit societies.
 Establish gardens, ponds, and orchards.
 Judicial functions (Nyaya Panchayat; the state judicial service decides jurisdiction.)
 Ensure quick and inexpensive justice.
 Can impose fines up to Rs. 100.
 Not represented by lawyers.

See also
 Binodpur Gram Panchayat
 Caste panchayat
 Khap
 Lambardar
 Zaildar

References

External links
 website of Ministry of Panchayati Raj Government of India

"Indian local governments" (Harvard University) 
"Indian local governments" (National Backward Krishi Vidyapeeth Solapur in India)

Panchayati raj (India)
Fifth-level administrative divisions by country